The 1965–66 Michigan State Spartans men's ice hockey team represented Michigan State University in college ice hockey. In its 15th year under head coach Amo Bessone the team compiled a 16–13–0 record and reached the NCAA tournament for the second time in its history. The Spartans defeated Clarkson 6–1 in the championship game at the Williams Arena in Minneapolis, Minnesota. as of 2018, the 1965–66 Michigan State team has the worst record of any national champion for Division I (or equivalent) ice hockey.

Season
Coming off of their first winning season in 3 years, Michigan State began the 1965–66 season on a sour note, losing both games at Colorado College and then continued their losing streak with the first two games of a three-game series against ECAC Hockey opponents. The Spartans finally earned a win against St. Lawrence to finish their road trip 1–4. State opened their home schedule against North Dakota with a split which continued with the succeeding two series against Denver and CC. MSU met their first Big Ten opponent when Minnesota arrived in mid-January but after the Golden Gophers handed Amo Bessone's team two losses the Spartans were wallowing near the bottom of their conference with a 3–7 record.

The only bright spot for MSU was that the WCHA had accepted Minnesota–Duluth into the conference and, as a result, changed the playoff format so all 8 teams would be included regardless of their records. MSU got back in the win column the following weekend against the Bulldogs, taking both games before travelling to Minneapolis to earn a split with the Gophers. MSU continued to slowly climb out of the cellar with two wins in their first home-and-home series with arch-rival Michigan and then extended their winning streak with two more wins against Wisconsin, bringing their all-time record against the Badgers to 6–0.

With a home playoff game in sight Michigan State was stopped dead in their tracks by defending national champion Michigan Tech who took two contests from the Spartans. MSU ended their regular season against Michigan with another home-and-home series but could only manage a split, finishing the season in 6th-place in the WCHA standings. Part of the rearrangement of the playoff system for the WCHA came with dividing the eight teams into two regions (east and west) with MSU being joined by Minnesota–Duluth, Michigan and Michigan Tech. Because Michigan had finished ahead of the Spartans (due to winning the final regular season game 1–0 in overtime), Michigan State had to open the conference tournament on the road. Despite the hostile crowd MSU was able to win the game against the 5th-place Wolverines and, because of an odd arrangement for the second round, headed back home for a match against top-seeded Michigan Tech. With the Spartan faithful cheering them on, Michigan State upset the Huskies 4–3, winning their first WCHA Tournament (shared with Denver) and advanced to their second NCAA Tournament.

Despite having a worse record than Denver, Michigan State was slated to play lower-seeded Boston University in the opening round, a team who was only in the tournament because ECAC runner-up Cornell declined the invitation. Michigan State's showed up in full force against the Terriers, holding BU to a single goal and winning a nail-biter 2–1 to advance to the title game. They met Clarkson for the championship, but unusually for an east-vs.-west matchup the two teams were familiar with one another with Clarkson having won a game early in the season. However, past was not prologue in this case and team captain Mike Coppo opened the scoring in the fifteenth minute of the opening frame. Clarkson tied the score just over three minutes later but that was the only goal they could get past Gaye Cooley and MSU began a string of five uninterrupted goals late in the second to win their first National championship.

Brian McAndrew, Mike Coppo, Don Heaphy and Gaye Cooley were all named to the All-Tournament first team while Bob Brawley and Tom Mikkola made the second team. Cooley was named Tournament Most Outstanding Player and, because of his job shepherding the Spartans through early-season injury and ice trouble, Amo Bessone shared the Spencer Penrose Award for national coach of the year with Clakrson's Len Ceglarski, the only time in history the award was split (as of 2018). The team's leading scorer, Doug Volmar was the only Spartan to be named to the AHCA All-American West Team or the All-WCHA First Team while none made it onto the WCHA Second Team.

Standings

Schedule

|-
!colspan=12 style=";" | Regular Season

|-
!colspan=12 style=";" | 

|-
!colspan=12 style=";" |

Roster and scoring statistics

Goaltending statistics

1966 championship game

(E2) Clarkson vs. (W2) Michigan State

References

Michigan State Spartans men's ice hockey seasons
Michigan State
Michigan State
Michigan State
Michigan State
Michigan State
Michigan State